Collins Park may refer to:

 Collins Park, Miami Beach
 Collins Park (Bayonne, New Jersey)
 Collins Park, Delaware